Border is the team representing the Border region in domestic first-class cricket in South Africa.  The team began playing in March 1898. When Cricket South Africa introduced the franchise system in 2004, Border merged with Eastern Province to form the Warriors.

Honours
 Currie Cup (0) -  ; shared (0) - 
 Standard Bank Cup (0) - 
 South African Airways Provincial Three-Day Challenge (0) - 
 South African Airways Provincial One-Day Challenge (0) -

Club history
Border have usually been one of the weaker teams in South Africa. From their initial first-class match in 1897-98 until the end of the 2017-18 season they had played 584 matches, resulting in 173 wins, 241 losses, one tie, and 169 draws. Border hold the record for the lowest aggregate score by a first class side in a match. During a Currie Cup match against Natal at Jan Smuts Ground in 1959-60, Border scored only 34 runs in the match - 16 in the first innings and 18 in the second innings.

In November 2017, Marco Marais scored 300 not out from 191 deliveries, batting for Border against Eastern Province in the 2017–18 Sunfoil 3-Day Cup. This was the fastest triple century in first-class cricket, the ninth triple century in first-class cricket in South Africa and the first in the country since 2010.

In March 2021, Border were dismissed for just sixteen runs in their second innings in the 2020–21 CSA 3-Day Provincial Cup, equalling the lowest team total in first-class cricket in South Africa.

Venues
Venues have included:
 Victoria Ground, King William's Town (occasional venue November 1903 – March 1958)
 Jan Smuts Ground, East London (main home ground March 1907 – January 1988)
 Victoria Recreation Ground, Queenstown (alternative venue March 1907 – November 1962)
 Cambridge Recreation Ground, East London (short-term venue December 1947 – January 1948)
 Buffalo Park, East London (main home ground October 1988 – present)

Squad
In April 2021, Cricket South Africa confirmed the following squad ahead of the 2021–22 season.

 Marco Marais
 Phaphama Fojela
 Thomas Kaber
 Gideon Peters
 Nonelela Yikha
 Jerry Nqolo
 Clayton Bosch
 Joshua van Heerden
 Jason Niemand
 Mncedisi Malika
 Sean Jamison

References

Further reading
 South African Cricket Annual – various editions
 Wisden Cricketers' Almanack – various editions

External links
Border at CricketArchive

South African first-class cricket teams
Cricket in the Eastern Cape